The Nation's Noodle was a brand of instant noodle snack foods from United Kingdom, available in a selection of flavors and varieties.

History
The product was launched in the United Kingdom on 3 August 2009, by Symington's, using the Golden Wonder name. Golden Wonder themselves had previously developed and owned UK-market leading brand Pot Noodle, now owned by Unilever.

As of February 2016, Symington's rebranded the snack food as Noodle Pot under the Golden Wonder name.

Current UK flavours 
All Day Breakfast (The Nation's Noodle)
Chicken and Mushroom (The Nation's Noodle)
Beef & Tomato (The Nation's Noodle)
Chip Shop Curry (The Nation's Noodle)
Inferno Chilli (The Nation's Noodle)
Spicy Tomato (The Nation's Pasta)
Spaghetti Bolognese (The Nation's Pasta)
Macaroni Cheese (The Nation's Pasta)

See also
List of instant noodle brands

References

External links 
 

Instant noodle brands
British snack foods
Food brands of the United Kingdom